The Adda (Latin Abdua, or Addua; in Lombard Ada or, again, Adda in local dialects where the double consonants are marked) is a river in North Italy, a tributary of the Po. It rises in the Alps near the border with Switzerland and flows through Lake Como. The Adda joins the Po a few kilometres upstream of Cremona.

Towns along the river Adda include Bormio, Tirano, Sondrio, Bellagio and Lecco (both on Lake Como), Brivio and Lodi.

Course 
The Adda's true source is in Alpisella valley near the head of the Fraele glen, but its volume is increased by the union with several smaller streams, near the town of Bormio, at the Rhaetian Alps. Thence it flows first southwest, then due west, through the fertile Valtellina, passing Tirano, where the Poschiavino falls in on the right bank, and Sondrio, where the Mallero joins, also on the right. This first half of the course of the Adda makes it the only big river of northern Italy to flow from east to west. It falls into Lake Como, at its northern end, and mainly forms that lake.

The lower course of the Adda was formerly the border between the Republic of Venice and the Duchy of Milan, after the Treaty of Lodi, 1454; and on its banks several important battles have been fought, notably that of Lodi, where Napoleon defeated the Austrians in 1796; several battles have also taken place at the bridgehead of Cassano d'Adda and surrounding countryside.

Tributaries
The Adda has the following tributaries (R on the right bank, L on the left, from source to mouth):
 Frodolfo (L) 
 Bormina (R)

 Roasco (R)
 Rezzalasco (L) 
 Lenasco (L) 
 Poschiavino (R)
 Mallero (R) 
 Masino (R) 
 Bitto (L) 
 Tartano (L) 
 Mera (Lake Como, R)
 Livo (Lake Como, R)
 Liro (Lake Como, R)
 Albano (Lake Como, R)
 Pioverna (Lake Como, L)
 Breggia (Lake Como, R)
 Cosia (Lake Como, R)
 Fiumelatte (Lake Como, L)
 Brembo (L) 
 Serio (L)

See also
 Val Pola landslide
 Battle of the Adda River, fought in 490 CE

Sources

External links

 Kayaking in the Adda river 

Adda basin
Rivers of Italy
Rivers of the Alps
Rivers of the Province of Bergamo
Rivers of the Province of Como
Rivers of the Province of Cremona
Rivers of the Province of Lecco
Rivers of the Province of Lodi
Rivers of the Province of Milan
Rivers of the Province of Sondrio